The Connecticut State Senate is the upper house of the Connecticut General Assembly, the state legislature of the U.S. state of Connecticut. The state senate comprises 36 members, each representing a district with around 99,280 inhabitants. Senators are elected to two-year terms without term limits. The Connecticut State Senate is one of 14 state legislative upper houses whose members serve two-year terms; four-year terms are more common.

As in other upper houses of state and territorial legislatures and the federal U.S. Senate, the Senate is reserved with special functions such as confirming or rejecting gubernatorial appointments to the state's executive departments, the state cabinet, commissions and boards. Unlike a majority of U.S. state legislatures, both the Connecticut House of Representatives and the State Senate vote on the composition to the Connecticut Supreme Court.

The Senate meets within the State Capitol in Hartford.

History
The Senate has its basis in the earliest incarnation of the General Assembly, the "General Corte" established in 1636 whose membership was divided between at least six generally elected magistrates (the predecessor of the Senate) and three-member "committees" representing each of the towns of the Connecticut Colony (the predecessors of the House of Representatives). The Fundamental Orders of Connecticut, adopted in 1639, renamed the committees to "deputies", the Corte to the Court, and established that the magistrates were generally elected for yearlong terms; the magistrate who received the highest number of votes would serve as governor for the year, so long as he had previously served as a magistrate and had not been governor the previous year. Other magistrates were elected deputy governor, secretary, and treasurer. Although the magistrates and deputies sat together, they voted separately and in 1645 it was decreed that a measure had to have the approval of both groups in order to pass. The Charter of 1662 replaced the six magistrates with twelve assistants, not including the governor and deputy governor, and renamed the legislature to the General Assembly. In 1698, the General Assembly split into a bicameral body, divided between the Council and the House of Representatives. The Council contained the twelve assistants, deputy governor, and governor, who led the body, while the House was led by a Speaker elected from among its members. Because the governor led it and other notables sat in it, the Council took precedence to the House and when the two chambers were at odds, the House deferred to the Council. The 1818 constitution renamed the Council to the Senate, removed the governor and deputy governor from its membership, and removed all remaining judicial and executive authority from it, but it remained largely the same in that it still consisted of twelve generally elected members. It was in 1828 that senatorial districts were established and the number of senators revised to between eight and twenty-four; the number was altered to between twenty-four and thirty-six in 1901, with the General Assembly setting it at thirty-six immediately. Senatorial terms were raised to two years in 1875.

In 1814–15, the Hartford Convention met in the Connecticut Senate chamber of what is now the Old State House.

Leadership of the Senate
The Lieutenant Governor of Connecticut serves as the President of the Senate, but only casts a vote if required to break a tie. In his or her absence, the President Pro Tempore of the Connecticut Senate presides. The President pro tempore is elected by the majority party caucus followed by confirmation of the entire Senate through a Senate Resolution. The President pro tempore is the chief leadership position in the Senate. The Senate majority and minority leaders are elected by their respective party caucuses.

The President of the Senate is Susan Bysiewicz of the Democratic Party. The President pro tempore is Democrat Martin Looney (D-New Haven). The Majority Leader is Bob Duff (D-Norwalk) and the Minority Leader is Kevin Kelly (R-Stratford).

Current leadership

Make-up of the Senate
As of January 2023, the makeup of the Connecticut Senate consisted of 24 seats for Democrats and 12 seats for Republicans. In the 2022 elections, Democrats picked up District 20, giving them 24 seats to the Republicans' 12 seats.

Members of the Senate
Current members of the Connecticut Senate, as of January 4, 2023.

Past composition of the Senate

See also
Connecticut State Capitol
Connecticut General Assembly
Connecticut House of Representatives
Historic Members of the Connecticut Senate

References

External links

Connecticut State Senate
Connecticut Senate Districts Map
State Senate of Connecticut at Project Vote Smart

Organizations established in 1698
Senate
State upper houses in the United States
1698 establishments in Connecticut
Government agencies established in the 1690s